West Gosforth was a railway station on the Ponteland Railway, which ran between South Gosforth and Ponteland, with a sub-branch line to Darras Hall. The station served Gosforth in Newcastle upon Tyne.

The station was opened on 1 June 1905, by the North Eastern Railway. It was situated near to the junction of the Great North Road (B1318) and Hollywood Avenue.

A signal box was located on the down platform, with access to a small goods shed at the back of the platform.

History 
The Gosforth and Ponteland Light Railway was formed in 1899, under the Light Railways Act of 1896. Construction of the line by the North Eastern Railway was authorised by Parliament in February 1901.

In March 1905, the 7-mile section from South Gosforth to Ponteland was opened to goods traffic, with passenger services commencing in June 1905.

A 11⁄4-mile extension of the branch line to the garden city of Darras Hall in Northumberland, known as the Little Callerton Railway, was authorised in 1909. Unlike the Gosforth and Ponteland Light Railway, the extension was not constructed as a light railway. Passenger services commenced between Ponteland and Darras Hall in October 1913.

In 1922, the branch line was served by six weekday passenger trains, with an additional train running on Saturday. Only three trains ran through to Darras Hall.

As a result of poor passenger numbers, the station, along with the branch line closed to passengers on 17 June 1929. It remained open for goods traffic, although the station at West Gosforth was downgraded to a public delivery siding on 23 August 1954, before closing altogether on 14 August 1967.

Tyne and Wear Metro

In May 1981, a section of the former branch line was reopened in stages between South Gosforth and Bank Foot, as part of the Tyne and Wear Metro network. The current station at Regent Centre is situated near to the site of the former at West Gosforth.

References

External links 

Former North Eastern Railway (UK) stations
Railway stations in Great Britain opened in 1905
Railway stations in Great Britain closed in 1929
1905 establishments in England
1967 disestablishments in England